Jiagou is a town in Yongqiao District, Suzhou, Anhui. , it administers one agricultural farm community, one forestry farm community, and the following 17 villages:
Jiagou Village
Jinpu Village
Wuliu Village
Qili Village
Huding Village
Zhentou Village
Huangshan Village
Xinfeng Village
Zhoupo Village
Weizhai Village
Qinwan Village
Zhaoji Village
Chayuan Village
Qingshan Village
Liying Village
Xialiuzhai Village
Sunzhai Village

References

Suzhou, Anhui
Township-level divisions of Anhui